Félix Eduardo Rodríguez Alanís (born April 16, 1992) is a professional Mexican footballer who currently plays for C.F. Monterrey Premier.

References

C.F. Monterrey players
1992 births
Living people
Mexican footballers
Association footballers not categorized by position
Place of birth missing (living people)
21st-century Mexican people